The 2017 Red Bull Air Race of Kazan was the fifth round of the 2017 Red Bull Air Race World Championship season, the eleventh season of the Red Bull Air Race World Championship. The event was held on Kazanka River in Kazan, Tatarstan, Russia. It was the first non-cancelled race taking place in Russia.

Master class

Qualification

  Incorrect passing (incorrect level flying) at gate 3
  Safety climb out
  Exceeding maximum G in gate 4

Round of 14

  Pylon Hit at gate 4
  Pylon hit at gate 6b
  Pylon hit at gate 10
  Pylon hit at gate 10, incorrect passing (incorrect level flying) in gate 14
  Pylon hit at gate 3
  Incorrect passing (incorrect level flying) in gate 14
  Pylon hit gate 10,11
  Pylon hit at gate 4

Round of 8

  Pylon hit
  Exceeding start speed limit, incorrect passing (climbing in the gate) 
  Pylon hit
  Pylon hit

Final 4

  Incorrect passing (incorrect level flying) in gate 3
  Pylon hits at gates 10, 11

Challenger Class

Results (Rescheduled Chiba race)

 Incorrect passing (incorrect level flying) at gate 14
 Pylon hit at gate 4
 Pylon hit at gate 4
 Pylon hit at gate 4

Results 

 Incorrect passing (incorrect level flying) in Gate 7
 Pylon hit at gates 4, 7, incorrect passing (incorrect level flying) in gate 14

Standings after the event

Master Class standings

Challenger Class standings (Rescheduled Chiba race)

Challenger Class standings

References

External links
 Kazan Red Bull Air Race

|- style="text-align:center"
|width="35%"|Previous race:2017 Red Bull Air Race of Budapest
|width="30%"|Red Bull Air Race2017 season
|width="35%"|Next race:2017 Red Bull Air Race of Porto
|- style="text-align:center"
|width="35%"|Previous race:none
|width="30%"|Red Bull Air Race of Kazan
|width="35%"|Next race:2018 Red Bull Air Race of Kazan
|- style="text-align:center"

Kazan
Red Bull Air Race World Championship
Red Bull Air Race World Championship